A Hundred Year Legacy is a 2013 South Korean television series starring Eugene and Lee Jung-jin. Revolving around themes of food, love and family, the warm human drama is about a modest Seoul noodle house that's been operated by the same family for three generations. It aired on MBC from January 5 to June 23, 2013 on Saturdays and Sundays at 21:50 for 50 episodes.

The early working title was Third Generation Noodle House.

It won Drama of the Year at the 2013 MBC Drama Awards.

Plot
Min Chae-won is the eldest granddaughter of a family living in an outskirts of Seoul who have been running a noodle factory for three generations. Married for three years to Chul-gyu, whose rich family owns the major corporation Golden Dragon Food, Chae-won has had a difficult life because her mother-in-law fiercely opposed the match and would not accept her.

When her husband cheats on her, she detaches herself from her in-laws and decides to divorce him. Her mother-in-law has her falsely committed to a mental institution as revenge for the divorce. She returns to the noodle factory and struggles to modernize and expand it. Chae-won later meets Lee Se-yoon, the son of a wealthy household, who is infamous for his disparaging treatment of all those around him. They both nurse wounds from their past romantic relationships.

Cast
 Eugene as Min Chae-won   
 Lee Jung-jin as Lee Se-yoon
 Choi Won-young as Kim Chul-gyu
 Yoon A-jung as Kim Joo-ri
 Shin Goo as Uhm Pyung-dal
 Jung Hye-sun as Kim Kkeut-soon
 Jung Bo-seok as Min Hyo-dong 
 Jeon In-hwa as Yang Choon-hee
 Kim Myung-soo as Uhm Ki-moon
 Park Joon-geum as Do Do-hee
 Seo Young-hoon  as Uhm Seul-hong
 Kwon Oh-joong as Uhm Ki-choon
 Kim Hee-jung as Gong Kang-sook
 Lee Tae-woo  as Uhm Bo-reum
 Sunwoo Sun as Uhm Ki-ok
 Park Yeong-gyu as Kang Jin
 Cha Hwa-yeon as Baek Seol-joo
 Nam Myung-ryul  as Lee Dong-kyu
 Park Won-sook as Bang Young-ja
 Gong Jung-hwan as Se-yoon's seonbae
 Hwang Sun-hee as Eun-seol
 Shim Yi-young as Ma Hong-joo
 Oh Ha-nee as Ha-nee
 Seo Kwon-soon as Hong-joo's mother
 Jeon Sung-ae as Mrs. Park
 Baek Bo-ram as shaman ("mudang")
 Min Joon-hyun as Chairman Bang's reporter
 Lee Hyun-woo

Awards and nominations

References

External links
  
 A Hundred Year Legacy at MBC Global Media
 

2013 South Korean television series debuts
2013 South Korean television series endings
MBC TV television dramas
Korean-language television shows
South Korean romance television series
Television series by Pan Entertainment